The 1951 Divizia B was the 12th season of the second tier of the Romanian football league system.

The format with two series has been maintained, each of them having 12 teams. At the end of the season the winners of the series promoted to Divizia A and the last two places from each one of the series relegated to District Championship. Also this was the second season played in the spring-autumn system, a system imposed by the new leadership of the country which were in close ties with the Soviet Union.

Team changes

To Divizia B
Promoted from District Championship
 CSA Câmpulung Moldovenesc
 CSA Craiova
 Metalul Sibiu
 Metalul Steagul Roșu

Relegated from Divizia A
 Metalul Reșița
 Locomotiva Sibiu

From Divizia B
Relegated to District Championship
 Progresul ICAS București
 Metalul Oțelu Roșu
 Flamura Roșie Bacău
 Metalul Brad

Promoted to Divizia A
 Dinamo Orașul Stalin
 Știința Cluj

Renamed teams 
Armata Cluj was renamed as CSA Cluj.

Partizanul Lupeni was renamed as Flacăra Lupeni.

Partizanul Mediaș was renamed as Flacăra Mediaș.

Partizanul Moreni was renamed as Flacăra Moreni.

Partizanul Ploiești was renamed as Flacăra Ploiești.

League tables

Serie I

Serie II

See also 

 1951 Divizia A

References

Liga II seasons
Romania
Romania
2
2